Chiaroscuro is an album by American guitarist Ralph Towner and Italian trumpeter Paolo Fresu recorded in 2008 and released on the ECM label.

Reception
The Allmusic review by Jeff Tamarkin awarded the album 4 stars, stating, "Chiaroscuro, naturally, boasts virtuosic musicianship, but it's never about that; it's about two artists coming together by chance and allowing their mutual respect to show them the way to something great".

Track listing
All compositions by Ralph Towner except as indicated
 "Wistful Thinking" - 4:19 
 "Punta Giara" - 6:21 
 "Chiaroscuro" - 6:31 
 "Sacred Place" - 4:13 
 "Blue in Green" (Miles Davis, Bill Evans) - 5:45 
 "Doubled Up" - 4:56 
 "Zephyr" - 7:29 
 "The Sacred Place (Reprise)" - 1:59 
 "Two Miniatures" (Paulo Fresu, Ralph Towner) - 2:38 
 "Postlude" (Fresu, Towner) - 2:31 
Recorded at Rainbow Studio in Oslo, Norway in October 2008.

Personnel
 Ralph Towner — classical guitar, 12 string guitar, baritone guitar
Paolo Fresu — trumpet, flugelhorn

References

ECM Records albums
Ralph Towner albums
2009 albums
Albums produced by Manfred Eicher